Creston is an unincorporated community in Casey County, Kentucky, United States.

Notes

Unincorporated communities in Casey County, Kentucky
Unincorporated communities in Kentucky